Wallace Percy Knapp (July 8, 1863 – August 29, 1917) was an American tennis player active in the late 19th century.

Knapp reached the All-Comers final of the U.S. National Championships in 1885 (beating Howard Taylor and Joseph Clark before losing to Godfrey Brinley) and 1890 (beating Clarence Hobart before losing to Oliver Campbell). Knapp also reached the semifinals in 1884 and 1889.

Grand Slam finals

All-Comers singles (2 runner-ups)

References

1863 births
1917 deaths
American male tennis players
Tennis people from Connecticut